Marty Carter (born December 17, 1969) is a former American football safety in the National Football League (NFL). He played for the Tampa Bay Buccaneers, Chicago Bears, Atlanta Falcons, and Detroit Lions.

1969 births
Living people
American football safeties
Tampa Bay Buccaneers players
Chicago Bears players
Atlanta Falcons players
Detroit Lions players
Middle Tennessee Blue Raiders football players